Steve Harrison may refer to:

 Steve Harrison (advertising), founder of Harrison Troughton Wunderman, creative director and author
 Steve Harrison (bobsleigh) (born 1972), New Zealand bobsledder
 Steve Harrison (footballer) (born 1952), English football player
 Steve Harrison (ice hockey) (born 1958), Canadian ice hockey defenceman
 Steve Harrison (politician) (born 1966), politician from West Virginia
 Steve Harrison (character), fictional detective created by Robert E. Howard

See also
 Harrison (name)
Stephen Harrison (disambiguation)